Entrepreneurs' Organization (EO) is a global non-profit organization formerly known as Young Entrepreneurs' Organization (YEO). The organization was founded in 1987.

History 
In 1987, 22 young entrepreneurs created an organization and what was then called The Young Entrepreneurs' Organization (YEO) expanded throughout the United States and Canada. Within a few years, membership grew to include chapters in Latin America, Europe, the Middle East, Africa, and Asia.
In 1996, YEO helped create the World Entrepreneurs’ Organization (WEO), which served as an alumni organization for YEO members who, after the age of 40, wanted to continue their involvement in an entrepreneurial membership organization. In 2005, YEO and WEO merged to form the Entrepreneurs’ Organization (EO) as it is known today. They continue a focus on youth with the annual Global Student Entrepreneur Awards and pitch contest.

Membership
Verne Harnish is the founder of the Young Entrepreneurs’ Organization and recruited 22 entrepreneurs as founding board members to initially fund the start-up of the organization. Some of the members were Kevin Harrington, of Shark Tank fame, Julie Brice, founder of I Can't Believe It's Not Yogurt, Neil Balter of the California Closet Company, and Lisa Renshaw of Penn Parking Inc. Members are required to have controlling ownership of a company with annual revenue of at least one million dollars. Membership has grown to over 15,000 worldwide with an average age of 44 and a series of chapters in more than 60 countries. As of 2015, it was estimated that approximately fifteen percent focused in arts and other soft businesses.

Global Entrepreneur Indicator 
The Global Entrepreneur Indicator (GEI) began in 2010 as a semi-annual survey of the membership of the Entrepreneurs’ Organization. The Global Entrepreneur Indicator surveys a globally representative sample of entrepreneurs to predict economic trends in a number of areas, including job creation, profits and debt loads, economic forecasting, and the business environment. 
In 2012, the GEI found that approximately 60% of businesses experienced a net profit, while 59% increased their employee headcount.

References

External links 
 

International charities
Business organizations based in the United States
Non-profit organizations based in Alexandria, Virginia
Organizations established in 1987